Elkanah Kibet (born June 2, 1983) is a Kenyan-born American long distance runner. An alumnus of Auburn University, he is also a financial management technician in the United States Army and competes in marathons as a member of the U.S. Army World Class Athlete Program.

Kibet won the 2015 and 2016 Reedy River Run 10k race. At the 2017 World Championships, Kibet finished 16th in the marathon. He came in fourth at the 2021 New York City Marathon in 2:11:15, a personal best. Kibet was set to compete at the 2022 New York City Marathon, but withdrew after receiving orders to report overseas.

References

External links 

 
 

1983 births
Living people
American male long-distance runners
Kenyan male long-distance runners
Place of birth missing (living people)
American male marathon runners
United States Army soldiers
Auburn University alumni
Kenyan emigrants to the United States
U.S. Army World Class Athlete Program